Rubus is a large and diverse genus of flowering plants in the rose family, Rosaceae, subfamily Rosoideae, with over 1,350 species.

Raspberries, blackberries, and dewberries are common, widely distributed members of the genus, and bristleberries are endemic to North America. Most of these plants have woody stems with prickles like roses; spines, bristles, and gland-tipped hairs are also common in the genus. The Rubus fruit, sometimes called a bramble fruit, is an aggregate of drupelets. The term "cane fruit" or "cane berry" applies to any Rubus species or hybrid which is commonly grown with supports such as wires or canes, including raspberries, blackberries, and hybrids such as loganberry, boysenberry, marionberry and tayberry. The stems of such plants are also referred to as canes.

Description 

Most species in the genus are hermaphrodites, Rubus chamaemorus being an exception.

Rubus species have a basic chromosome number of seven. Polyploidy from the diploid (14 chromosomes) to the tetradecaploid (98 chromosomes) is exhibited.

Taxonomy

Modern classification 

Rubus is very complex, particularly within the blackberry/dewberry subgenus (Rubus), with polyploidy, hybridization, and facultative apomixis apparently all frequently occurring, making species classification of the great variation in the subgenus one of the grand challenges of systematic botany.

Some treatments have recognized dozens of species each for what other, comparably qualified botanists have considered single, more variable species. On the other hand, species in the other Rubus subgenera (such as the raspberries) are generally distinct, or else involved in more routine one-or-a-few taxonomic debates, such as whether the European and American red raspberries are better treated as one species or two (in this case, the two-species view is followed here, with R. idaeus and R. strigosus both recognized; if these species are combined, then the older name R. idaeus has priority for the broader species).

The classification presented below recognizes 13 subgenera within Rubus, with the largest subgenus (Rubus) in turn divided into 12 sections. Representative examples are presented, but many more species are not mentioned here. A comprehensive 2019 study found subgenera Orobatus and Anoplobatus to be monophyletic, while all other subgenera to be paraphyletic or polyphyletic.

Phylogeny 
The genus has a likely North American origin, with fossils known from the Eocene-aged Florissant Formation of Colorado. Rubus expanded into Eurasia, South America, and Oceania during the Miocene. Fossil seeds from the early Miocene of Rubus have been found in the Czech part of the Zittau Basin. Many fossil fruits of †Rubus laticostatus, †Rubus microspermus and †Rubus semirotundatus have been extracted from bore hole samples of the Middle Miocene fresh water deposits in Nowy Sacz Basin, West Carpathians, Poland.

Molecular data have backed up classifications based on geography and chromosome number, but following morphological data, such as the structure of the leaves and stems, do not appear to produce a phylogenetic classification.

Species 

Better-known species of Rubus include:

Rubus aboriginum – garden dewberry
Rubus allegheniensis – Allegheny blackberry
Rubus arcticus – Arctic raspberry
Rubus argutus
Rubus armeniacus – Himalayan blackberry
Rubus caesius – European dewberry
Rubus canadensis – smooth blackberry
Rubus chamaemorus – cloudberry
Rubus cockburnianus
Rubus coreanus – bokbunja
Rubus crataegifolius
Rubus deliciosus
Rubus domingensis
Rubus ellipticus
Rubus flagellaris – northern dewberry
Rubus fraxinifolius – mountain raspberry
Rubus glaucus
Rubus hawaiensis
Rubus hayata-koidzumii
Rubus hispidus – swamp dewberry
Rubus idaeus – red raspberry
Rubus illecebrosus
Rubus laciniatus – cut-leaved blackberry
Rubus leucodermis – whitebark raspberry
Rubus moluccanus
Rubus nepalensis
Rubus nivalis – snow raspberry
Rubus niveus
Rubus occidentalis – black raspberry
Rubus odoratus – purple-flowered raspberry
Rubus parviflorus – thimbleberry
Rubus pedatus
Rubus pensilvanicus – Pennsylvania blackberry
Rubus phoenicolasius – wineberry
Rubus probus
Rubus pubescens – dwarf raspberry
Rubus rosifolius
Rubus saxatilis – stone bramble
Rubus spectabilis – salmonberry
Rubus tricolor
Rubus trivialis – Southern dewberry
Rubus ulmifolius – elm-leaved blackberry
Rubus ursinus – trailing blackberry
Rubus vestitus – European blackberry

A more complete subdivision is as follows:

Hybrid berries 

The term "hybrid berry" is often used collectively for those fruits in the genus Rubus which have been developed mainly in the U.S. and U.K. in the last 130 years. As Rubus species readily interbreed and are apomicts (able to set seed without fertilisation), the parentage of these plants is often highly complex, but is generally agreed to include cultivars of blackberries (R. ursinus, R. fruticosus) and raspberries (R. idaeus). The British National Collection of Rubus stands at over 200 species and, although not within the scope of the National Collection, also hold many cultivars.

The hybrid berries include:-
 loganberry (California, U.S., 1883) R. × loganobaccus, a spontaneous hybrid between R. ursinus 'Aughinbaugh' and R. idaeus 'Red Antwerp'
 boysenberry (U.S., 1920s) a hybrid between R. idaeus and R. × loganobaccus
 olallieberry (U.S., 1930s) a hybrid between the loganberry and youngberry, themselves both hybrid berries
 veitchberry (Europe, 1930s) a hybrid between R. fruticosus and R. idaeus
 skellyberry (Texas, U.S., 2000s), a hybrid between R. invisus and R. phoenicolasius
 marionberry (1956) now thought to be a blackberry cultivar R. 'Marion'
 silvanberry, R. 'Silvan', a hybrid between R. 'Marion' and the boysenberry
 tayberry (Dundee, Scotland, 1979), another blackberry/raspberry hybrid
 tummelberry, R. 'Tummel', from the same Scottish breeding programme as the tayberry
 hildaberry (1980s), a tayberry/boysenberry hybrid discovered by an amateur grower
 youngberry, a complex hybrid of raspberries, blackberries, and dewberries

Etymology 
The generic name means blackberry in Latin and was derived from the word ruber, meaning "red".

The blackberries, as well as various other Rubus species with mounding or rambling growth habits, are often called brambles. However, this name is not used for those like the raspberry that grow as upright canes, or for trailing or prostrate species, such as most dewberries, or various low-growing boreal, arctic, or alpine species. The scientific study of brambles is known as "batology".

See also 
 List of Lepidoptera that feed on Rubus
 Mulberry, an unrelated deciduous tree with similar looking fruit

References

External links 

 
 Rubus at the Western Kentucky University

 
Rosaceae genera
Subshrubs
Extant Eocene first appearances